David Hollister (born April 3, 1942) served as the mayor of Lansing, Michigan from 1993 to 2003, until he resigned to be the director of the Michigan Department of Labor and Economic Growth under Michigan Governor Jennifer Granholm's administration.

Mayor 
During his tenure as mayor, he was instrumental in convincing General Motors Corporation to build the Grand River Assembly Plant downtown, and to build a new plant in the region to replace the Lansing Car Assembly Plant which dated back to 1903. Also under his tenure came the completion of Cooley Law School Stadium, the stadium for the Lansing Lugnuts, a Class A minor league baseball team. Hollister made central city (including downtown and Old Town) revitalization a top priority of his administration.

Biography

Early life 
Hollister was born in Kalamazoo and raised in Battle Creek, Michigan, where he graduated from Battle Creek Central High School. He earned bachelor's and master's degrees from Michigan State University.

Career 
From 1967 to 1970 he was a social studies teacher at Lansing Eastern High School. Prior to becoming mayor, he served in the Michigan House of Representatives from 1973-1993 representing the City of Lansing. In 2005 he was recruited to run Prima Civitas, an economic development organization funded by Michigan State University and the city governments of Lansing and East Lansing, Michigan.

References 

1942 births
Living people
Michigan State University alumni
County commissioners in Michigan
Mayors of Lansing, Michigan
State cabinet secretaries of Michigan
Democratic Party members of the Michigan House of Representatives
20th-century American politicians
21st-century American politicians